Sven Pontus Kåmark (born 5 April 1969) is a Swedish former professional footballer who played as a defender. He played for Västerås SK, IFK Göteborg, Leicester City, and AIK, and won 57 caps for the Sweden national team. He was a part of the Sweden team that finished third at the 1994 FIFA World Cup.

Club career 
Kåmark started off his career with IK Franke before making his senior debut for Västerås SK.

IFK Göteborg 
Kåmark signed with IFK Göteborg ahead of the 1989 Allsvenskan season and made his debut on 11 May 1989 in an Allsvenskan game against GAIS that ended 2–2. In 1990, Kåmark won his first league title with Göteborg, appearing in 8 league games. The following season, he appeared in 16 league games and 6 Svenska Cupen games when Göteborg won both the 1991 Allsvenskan as well as the 1991 Svenska Cupen. Between 1993 and 1995, Kåmark played in more than 60 league games as IFK Göteborg won three straight Allsvenskan titles.

In the 1994–95 UEFA Champions League, Kåmark scored the last goal in a 3–1 win against Manchester United as IFK Göteborg won Group A ahead of FC Barcelona, Manchester United and Galatasaray. Kåmark played in all 180 minutes as the captain when IFK Göteborg was eliminated by FC Bayern Munich on away goals in the quarter-finals.

Leicester City 
Kåmark was bought by Leicester City from Göteborg for £840,000 in September 1995, but did not join the team until IFK Göteborg had lifted the 1995 Allsvenskan trophy. Only three days after making his debut for the club, Kåmark tore his ACL in a League Cup game against Bolton Wanderers, which ruled him out of football for a year. Kåmark eventually recovered from his injury and made his comeback in January 1997, eventually helping his team win the 1996–97 Football League Cup, playing in all 120 minutes in the final.

AIK 
Kåmark signed for the 1998 Allsvenskan champions AIK in the summer of 1999, ahead of their 1999–2000 UEFA Champions League campaign. AIK was able to keep a clean sheet in all 12 of Kåmark's first games for the club. He eventually helped the team qualify for the Champions League group stage by playing at left back when AIK eliminated AEK Athens in the qualifying stage. AIK finished last in Group B, competing with Barcelona, Arsenal and Fiorentina. He tore his ACL once again during the 2000 spring season and left AIK at the end of the season.

Return to IFK Göteborg and retirement 
After recovering from his third ACL injury, Kåmark return to IFK Göteborg for the 2001 Allsvenskan season. He retired from professional football in 2002.

International career

Youth 
Kåmark won a total of 35 caps for the Sweden U17, U19, and U21 teams and represented his country at the 1990 UEFA European Under-21 Championship where Sweden reached the semifinals.

Senior 
He made his senior debut for Sweden in a friendly against the United Arab Emirates on 14 February 1990.

Kåmark played in three games as Sweden qualified for the 1994 FIFA World Cup. At the final tournament, Kåmark appeared in four games as Sweden finished third behind Brazil and Italy. He appeared in five games as Sweden failed to qualify for Euro 1996, and in four games as Sweden missed out on qualifying for the 1998 FIFA World Cup. He helped Sweden qualify for both Euro 2000 and the 2002 FIFA World Cup, but missed both final tournaments because of injuries.

He made his last international appearance in a friendly against Greece on 13 February 2002. Kåmark ultimately won 57 caps for Sweden without scoring.

Career statistics

Club

International 
Appearances and goals by national team and year

Honours

IFK Göteborg
Allsvenskan: 1990, 1991, 1993, 1994, 1995
Svenska Cupen: 1991

Leicester City
Football League Cup: 1996–97

Sweden
FIFA World Cup third place: 1994

References

External links

 

1969 births
Living people
Sportspeople from Västerås
Expatriate footballers in England
Swedish expatriate footballers
Swedish footballers
IFK Göteborg players
AIK Fotboll players
Leicester City F.C. players
Sweden international footballers
Sweden under-21 international footballers
Sweden youth international footballers
1994 FIFA World Cup players
Premier League players
Allsvenskan players
Västerås SK Fotboll players
Association football defenders